Kukułczyn  (formerly German Neuwelt) is a settlement in the administrative district of Gmina Malechowo, within Sławno County, West Pomeranian Voivodeship, in north-western Poland.

See also
 History of Pomerania

References

Villages in Sławno County

de:Sulechówko#Ortsgliederung